The table below shows a list of the most notable holidays in Venezuela. Popular and public holidays are included in the list.

Other public holidays may be observed. In 2019, several days were announced as national holidays based on widespread blackouts.

Official holidays 
Information adapted from the Office of National Holidays.

Popular holidays

References 

 
Venezuelan culture
Society of Venezuela
Venezuela
Holidays